A. S. Panchapakesa Ayyar (1899–1963) was an Indian novelist, dramatist, short story writer and justice. He was elected as a fellow of the Royal Society of Literature, London in 1933.

Life
A. S. P. Ayyar was born on 26 January 1899 at Ayilam, a village near Palghat in Kerala state to a landlord father. He initially studied at Trivandrum and Madras, and moved to England in 1919 to study at Oxford University, and became a lawyer. In 1933, he was elected as a fellow of the Royal Society of Literature, London. He was appointed the justice of the Madras High Court during 1948–59.

He married Vedanayaki Ammal in 1919. They had a son, A. P. Venkateswaran (1930–2014), who was a diplomat.

Works
Ayyar had published about 27 works which include novels, plays, short stories, literary criticism, religious works, jurisprudence, travelogue, biography and an autobiography. He had translated several Sanskrit works into English.

Ayyar wrote his novels in late 1940s and in early 1950s. His novels have historical settings. His first novel A Historical Romance of Ancient India (1930) tells a story of a Gupta king who resisted the Hun invaders during the 6th-century. His novel Three Men of Destiny (1039) is a story of Alexander the Great, with two other main characters: Chandragupta Maurya and Chanakya.

He wrote his autobiography under the title Twenty Five Years a Civilian (1962).

References

Further reading

External links
 

1899 births
1963 deaths
Dramatists and playwrights from Kerala
Fellows of the Royal Society of Literature
Indian autobiographers
Novelists from Kerala
Indian historical novelists